George Campbell Wheeler VC (7 April 1880 – 26 August 1938) was a recipient of the Victoria Cross, the highest and most prestigious award for gallantry in the face of the enemy that can be awarded to British and Commonwealth forces.

Early life 
Wheeler was born in 1880, and attended Bedford School from 1893 to 1897. He was commissioned a second lieutenant in the Indian Staff Corps on 20 January 1900, and served with the 9th (Gurkha Rifle) Bengal Infantry. He was promoted to lieutenant on 20 April 1902.

Details 
He was 36 years old, and a major in the 2nd Battalion, 9th Gurkha Rifles, British Indian Army during World War I when the following deed took place for which he was awarded the VC.

On 23 February 1917 at Shumran on the River Tigris, Mesopotamia, Major Wheeler, together with one Gurkha officer and eight men of Khas battalion crossed the river and rushed the enemy's trench in the face of very heavy fire. Having obtained a footing on the far bank, he was almost immediately counter-attacked by the enemy with a party of bombers. Major Wheeler at once led a charge, receiving in the process a severe bayonet wound in the head. In spite of this, however, he managed to disperse the enemy and consolidate his position.

He later achieved the rank of lieutenant colonel.

The medal
His Victoria Cross is displayed at the National Army Museum, Chelsea, London.

Notes

See also 
List of Brigade of Gurkhas recipients of the Victoria Cross

References 
Monuments to Courage (David Harvey, 1999)
The Register of the Victoria Cross (This England, 1997)

External links 
Location of grave and VC medal (Hampshire)

1880 births
1938 deaths
People from Yokohama
People educated at Bedford School
British World War I recipients of the Victoria Cross
British Indian Army officers
Indian Army personnel of World War I
Indian Staff Corps officers
British military personnel of the Waziristan Campaign